Hermann Schweickert (14 November 1885 – 24 August 1962) was a German international footballer who played for 1. FC Pforzheim. He was also capped once for the German national team in 1909.

References

External links
 

1885 births
1962 deaths
Association football forwards
German footballers
Germany international footballers
1. FC Pforzheim players
Sportspeople from Pforzheim
Footballers from Baden-Württemberg